Václav Zavázal (10 February 1921 – 11 March 1986) was a Czech sports shooter. He competed in the trap event at the 1960 Summer Olympics. He died on 11 March 1986, at the age of 65.

References

External links
 

1921 births
1986 deaths
Czech male sport shooters
Olympic shooters of Czechoslovakia
Shooters at the 1960 Summer Olympics
People from Příbram District
Sportspeople from the Central Bohemian Region